INS Kesari is a  of the Indian Navy.

History
The ship was launched by Sandhya Prasad, wife of Vice Chief of Naval Staff, Vice Admiral Yashwant Prasad.

In 2009, INS Kesari was transferred from the Eastern Naval Command in Vishakhapatnam to Port Blair.

In March 2014, the ship, under the command of Commander Mahesh Mangipudi, was involved in the hunt for Malaysia Airlines Flight 370 in the Indian Ocean region.

References

External links
Shardul class @ Bharat-rakshak.com
LST(L) Shardul @ Global security.com
Image of INS Kesari

Shardul-class tank landing ships
Amphibious warfare vessels of the Indian Navy
2005 ships